Sparta is a city in north central Christian County, Missouri, United States. The population was 1,756 at the 2010 census.

Sparta is part of the Springfield, Missouri Metropolitan Statistical Area.

History
A post office called Sparta has been in operation since 1876. The city's name is a transfer from Sparta, Tennessee.  Sparta got rail service when a subsidiary of the St. Louis–San Francisco Railway (Frisco) extended a line from Ozark, Missouri to Chadwick, Missouri in the Spring of 1883.  But passenger service on the Frisco line was discontinued in March of 1933, and in 1934 the line from Ozark to Chadwick was abandoned entirely.

Geography
Sparta is in north central Christian County on the south edge of the Springfield Plateau. The community lies at the intersection of Missouri Route 14 and Missouri Route 125 approximately six miles east of Ozark. To the south and southeast the edge of the plateau is dissected by the headwaters of Bull and Swan creeks.

Demographics

2010 census
As of the census of 2010, there were 1,756 people, 696 households, and 476 families residing in the city. The racial makeup of the city was 96.6% White, 0.2% African American, 0.7% Native American, 0.3% Asian, 0.5% from other races, and 1.7% from two or more races. Hispanic or Latino of any race were 2.6% of the population.

There were 696 households, of which 40.7% had children under the age of 18 living with them, 49.7% were married couples living together, 14.4% had a female householder with no husband present, 4.3% had a male householder with no wife present, and 31.6% were non-families. 27.9% of all households were made up of individuals, and 12.1% had someone living alone who was 65 years of age or older. The average household size was 2.52 and the average family size was 3.07.

The median age in the city was 30.8 years. 29.3% of residents were under the age of 18; 9.4% were between the ages of 18 and 24; 30.3% were from 25 to 44; 18.8% were from 45 to 64; and 12.1% were 65 years of age or older. The gender makeup of the city was 47.1% male and 52.9% female.

2000 census
As of the census of 2000, there were 1,144 people, 463 households, and 324 families residing in the city. The population density was 1,304.3 people per square mile (501.9/km2). There were 509 housing units at an average density of 580.3 per square mile (223.3/km2). The racial makeup of the city was 96.50% White, 0.26% African American, 0.87% Native American, 0.35% Asian, 0.35% from other races, and 1.66% from two or more races. Hispanic or Latino of any race were 1.22% of the population.

There were 463 households, out of which 87.8% had children under the age of 18 living with them, 49.2% were married couples living together, 45.3% had a female householder with no husband present, and 30.0% were non-families. 26.6% of all households were made up of individuals, and 13.6% had someone living alone who was 65 years of age or older. The average household size was 2.47 and the average family size was 2.92.

In the city the population was spread out, with 10.9% under the age of 18, 2.8% from 18 to 24, 10.3% from 25 to 44, 38.6% from 45 to 64, and 64.3% who were 65 years of age or older. The median age was 62 years. For every 100 females, there were 60.7 males. For every 100 females age 18 and over, there were 61.2 males.

The median income for a household in the city was $16,768, and the median income for a family was $17,981. Males had a median income of $15,227 versus $11,206 for females. The per capita income for the city was $6,869. About 34.3% of families and 87.7% of the population were below the poverty line, including 32.1% of those under age 18 and 11.4% of those age 65 or over.

Government and infrastructure
Sparta has a Mayor and Board of Alderman System with 2 wards and 2 alderman per ward. As of July 2021, the mayor is Jenni Davis and as of April 2018, Ward 1 alderman are Jenni Davis and Jason Stephens and Ward 2 alderman are Steve Otten and Jarret Iorg. After several closed meetings, City Clerk Sharon Mickey was terminated from the city by Mayor Nathan Stapp. Mayor Stapp cited poor attitude and Sharon Mickey's threatening to delete the city's accounting software as reasons for her termination.

Sparta provides policing services through the Sparta Police Department. Since March 2016, the chief of police is Trampus Taylor of Ava, Missouri. Sparta has one patrol officer and some reserve police officers. The Christian County Sheriff's office provides services when no Sparta police officer is available.

Education
The Sparta R-III School District is a K–12 institution of about 750 students that serves Sparta and the surrounding area and has been led by Landon Gray since 2021.

Notable person
 William T. Tyndall, Missouri congressman (1905-1907) and Sparta postmaster (1891-1893, 1897-1905)

References

Cities in Christian County, Missouri
Springfield metropolitan area, Missouri